Alina Marti (born 23 April 2004) is a Swiss ice hockey player and member of the Swiss national ice hockey team, currently playing in the Women's League (SWHL A) with the ZSC Lions Frauen.

Marti was the youngest player to represent Switzerland at the 2021 IIHF Women's World Championship, aged 17 years and 4 months. As a junior player with the Swiss national under-18 team, she participated in the 2020 IIHF Women's U18 World Championship. At the 2020 Winter Youth Olympics, she played for Switzerland in the girls' ice hockey tournament.

References

External links
 
 

Living people
2004 births
People from Oberaargau District
Swiss women's ice hockey forwards
Ice hockey players at the 2020 Winter Youth Olympics
Olympic ice hockey players of Switzerland
Ice hockey players at the 2022 Winter Olympics
Sportspeople from the canton of Bern